Stine Andresen (née Jürgens) (1849–1927) was a German poet from the North Frisian island of Föhr. Her lyrics often refer to her native island. In addition to poems in German, she wrote some poetry in Fering North Frisian.

Life and opus
Stine Andresen was born to farmer Jürgen Erich Jürgens in Boldixum (now a part of Wyk auf Föhr) and spent most of her life there. Her mother died early. Andresen attended grammar school in Boldixum and improved her education by reading. Quite early she used to write occasional poems which were recited upon festivities. She was friendly with the family of poet Friedrich Hebbel, and after his death worked as a secretary for Hebbel's widow Christine for some time.

In 1875 she married miller Emil Andresen who died during the 1890s. Already in 1893 poems by Stine Andresen were printed and published. When her financial situation worsened due to the death of her husband, the author Karl Schrattenthal supported her by reprinting her works.

Reception and aftermath
Two of her works were set to music for choir by composer Ferdinand Thieriot. The town of Wyk auf Föhr named a street "Stine-Andresen-Weg".

Honours
 1917 - Friedrich Hebbel Prize
 1918 - Friedrich Hebbel Prize (together with Hans Groß)
 1919 - Friedrich Hebbel Prize (together with Hans Groß)
 1920 - Friedrich Hebbel Prize (together with Hans Groß)

Selected works

Letters

Bibliography

External links
 Gesammelte Gedichte and picture of Stine Andresen

1849 births
1927 deaths
People from Wyk auf Föhr
People from the Duchy of Schleswig
North Frisians
19th-century German poets
Writers from Schleswig-Holstein
Frisian writers
German women poets
20th-century German poets
19th-century German women writers
20th-century German women writers
German Frisians